Justin Quintin Reid (born February 15, 1997) is an American football safety for the Kansas City Chiefs of the National Football League (NFL). He played college football at Stanford. He previously played in the NFL for the Houston Texans.

Early years
Reid attended Dutchtown High School in Geismar, Louisiana. He committed to Stanford University to play college football.

College career
Reid played at Stanford from 2015 to 2017. After his junior season in 2017, he decided to forgo his senior year and enter the 2018 NFL Draft. During his career, he had 170 tackles, six interceptions and one sack.

Professional career
On January 9, 2018, Reid announced his decision on Twitter to forgo his remaining eligibility and enter the 2018 NFL Draft. Reid attended the NFL Scouting Combine and completed all of the combine and positional drills. He was a top performer at his position in the majority of drills and finished second among safeties in the 40-yard dash, third in the short shuttle and three-cone drill, fifth in the broad jump, eighth in the vertical jump, and 11th in the bench press. On March 22, 2018, Reid participated at Stanford's pro day, but chose to stand on his combine numbers and only performed positional drills. He attended pre-draft visits and private workouts with multiple teams, including the Pittsburgh Steelers, Carolina Panthers, Seattle Seahawks, Detroit Lions, and Philadelphia Eagles. At the conclusion of the pre-draft process, Reid was projected to be a first or second round pick by NFL draft experts and scouts. He was ranked as the top free safety prospect in the draft by DraftScout.com and was ranked as the third best safety in the draft by Scouts Inc. and Sports Illustrated.

The Houston Texans selected Reid in the third round (68th overall) of the 2018 NFL Draft. Reid was the fifth safety drafted in 2018. Reid unexpectedly fell from the first or second round and was ranked among the top steals of the 2018 NFL Draft.

On June 10, 2018, the Houston Texans signed Reid to a four-year, $4.06 million contract that includes a signing bonus of $1.03 million.

Houston Texans

2018

On October 7, 2018 in Week 5 against the Dallas Cowboys, he recorded his first career interception off of Dak Prescott in a 19-16 win.

On November 18, 2018 in a Week 11 matchup against the Washington Redskins, he intercepted Alex Smith for a 101-yard touchdown in a 23-21 win.

2019

In week 2 against the Jacksonville Jaguars, Reid made 4 tackles and stopped running back Leonard Fournette on a two point conversion attempt as the Texans won 13-12.
In week 9 against the Jaguars in London, Reid recorded his first interception of the season off Gardner Minshew and returned it for 37 yards in the 26–3 win.
In week 16 against the Tampa Bay Buccaneers, Reid intercepted a pass thrown by Jameis Winston and recovered a fumble lost by Peyton Barber during the 23–20 win. On January 22, 2020, ten days after losing the AFC divisional round to the Chiefs, it was revealed that Reid was diagnosed with a torn labrum in his shoulder, confessing that he was plagued with the injury since the season began.

2020
In Week 11 against the New England Patriots, Reid led the team with nine tackles and recorded his first sack of the season on Cam Newton during the 27–20 win. He was placed on injured reserve on December 16, 2020 after suffering a hand injury in Week 14.

Kansas City Chiefs

2022
Reid signed a three-year, $31.5 million contract with the Kansas City Chiefs on March 17, 2022. Following an injury to kicker Harrison Butker in week 1, Reid was substituted at kicker for him. He went 1 of 2 on extra points and had a touchback before Butker returned to the game. Reid would continue to kick for the Chiefs on kickoffs kicking three more of them into the end zone for a touchback. In Reid's first season with the Chiefs, he helped them win Super Bowl LVII over the Philadelphia Eagles 38-35 to give Reid his first Super Bowl ring. In the Super Bowl, Reid recorded 7 tackles.

NFL career statistics

Regular season statistics

Postseason statistics

Personal life
His older brother, Eric, played in the NFL.

References

External links
Stanford Cardinal bio
Houston Texans bio

1997 births
Living people
People from Prairieville, Louisiana
Players of American football from Louisiana
American football safeties
Stanford Cardinal football players
Houston Texans players
Kansas City Chiefs players
Ed Block Courage Award recipients